The Pine Grove Station Site is a former way station on the Overland Trail in Carbon County, Wyoming, near Bridger's Pass. The station was burned in 1865 and 1867 by Indians. Nothing remains of the station. The site was placed on the National Register of Historic Places on December 6, 1978.

References

External links
 Pine Grove Station Site at the Wyoming State Historic Preservation Office

National Register of Historic Places in Carbon County, Wyoming
Overland Trail
Stagecoach stations on the National Register of Historic Places in Wyoming